Patricia Yancey Martin  is an American sociologist. She is the Daisy Parker Flory Professor of Sociology Emerita at Florida State University.

Education 
Martin was inducted into Alpha Lambda Delta her freshman year at University of Alabama in 1959. She earned a Bachelor of Arts in English literature from University of Alabama in 1962 with Phi Beta Kappa honors. She was a Woodrow Wilson Fellow in 1962. In 1964, she completed a Master of Arts in sociology from Florida State University and was inducted into Phi Kappa Phi and Alpha Kappa Delta. She later earned a doctorate in sociology from the same institution in 1969. Her dissertation was titled Choice among professions: a comparative study of medicine, law, and college teaching. Her doctoral advisor was Charles M. Grigg.

Career 
Martin began working as an assistant professor and research associate at Florida State University in 1969.

Awards and honors 
In 2007, Martin was awarded the Jessie Bernard Award from the American Sociological Association.

References

External links 

 

Year of birth missing (living people)
Living people
20th-century American women writers
21st-century American women writers
University of Alabama alumni
Florida State University alumni
Florida State University faculty
American women social scientists
American sociologists
American women sociologists